The 1930 Texas Tech Matadors football team represented Texas Technological College—now known as Texas Tech University—as an independent during the 1930 college football season. In their first season under head coach Pete Cawthon, the Matadors compiled a 3–6 record and were outscored by opponents by a combined total of 122 to 90. The team played its home games at Tech Field.

Schedule

References

Texas Tech
Texas Tech Red Raiders football seasons
Texas Tech Matadors football